Rachel Bright is an English author and illustrator who resides in Dorset with her partner and two daughters.

Early life and education 
Bright grew up in Shropshire. She attended New College, where she concentrated on art; she later trained in graphics at Kingston University. Bright also received a Masters Degree in Printmaking at the University of the West of England, Bristol.

Career 
After completing her education at Kingston, Bright took on a job as a junior designer at stationers Smythson. She briefly worked as an air hostess with Virgin Atlantic before leaving to focus on her art career.

Bright has written and illustrated 24 published books, including the children’s picture book series Love Monster. In 2020 the series was adapted for television as an animated children's show. Bright has written two episodes for the series, "Challenge Yourself Day" and "Lost Things Day".

Bright is the author of The Lion Inside series (illustrated by Jim Field (illustrator)) and the Dino Feelings series (illustrated by Chris Chatterton).

Her books have sold well over 3 million copies and been translated into over 40 languages.

In 2021 Bright published Peter Rabbit Head Over Tail, inspired by Beatrix Potter's character Peter Rabbit, which is illustrated by Nicola Kinnear. Followed by Peter Rabbit Head Over Tail in 2022.

Bibliography

Author 
The Lion Inside - illustrated by Jim Field
The Koala Who Could - illustrated by Jim Field
The Squirrels Who Squabbled - illustrated by Jim Field
The Way Home for Wolf - illustrated by Jim Field
The Whale Who Wanted More - illustrated by Jim Field
The Worrysaurus - illustrated by Chris Chatterton
 The stompysaurus - illustrated by Chris Chatterton
The Hugasaurus - illustrated by Chris Chatterton
Slug in Love - illustrated by Nadia Shireen
FreeRange Freddy - illustrated by Izzy Evans
Side by Side - illustrated by Debbie Gliori
Snowflake in my Pocket - illustrated by Yu Rong
Peter Rabbit Head Over Tail - illustrated by Nicola Kinnear
Peter Rabbit Hide and Seek - illustrated by Nicola Kinnear

Author and illustrator 
Love Monster
Love Monster and the Last Chocolate
Love Monster and the Scary Something
Love Monster and the Perfect Present
Love Monster and the Extremely Big Wave
Walter & the No-need-to Worry Suit
Benjamin & the Super Spectacles
All I Want For Christmas
My Sister Is An Alien
Mine
Amazing Daddy
When I’m Bigger Mama Bear
In A Minute, Mama Bear
Love You Hoo

Awards 
World Book Day illustrator (2013)
Writer for the Carmelite prize (2016)
Oscar’s Book Prize (2017, won - The Koala Who Could)
Nottingham Children’s Book Award - ‘My sister is an Alien’ (won)

References

External links
 

1979 births
Living people
Alumni of the University of the West of England, Bristol
Writers from Dorset
British women screenwriters
21st-century English women writers
English children's book illustrators
Alumni of Kingston University
Flight attendants